Mary Alice Dorrance Malone is an American billionaire and heiress to the Campbell Soup Company fortune.

Early life
Mary Alice Dorrance is the daughter of John T. "Jack" Dorrance Jr (died 1989), the last Dorrance to run Campbell, and the granddaughter of John Thompson Dorrance. She has a bachelor's degree from the University of Arizona.

Career
When her father died in 1989, she and her two brothers shared roughly one-third of the company.

Malone is the Campbell Soup Company's largest shareholder, and a board member, along with her brother Bennett Dorrance, a Phoenix real estate developer. Her other brother is John Dorrance III.

Personal life
She was married to Stuart Malone, divorced in the mid-1990s, has two children, and lives in Coatesville, Pennsylvania.

In 2009-10, she was the victim of an extortion attempt by her "longtime cook, traveling companion and confidante", involving "a tell-all book and movie about the heiress's personal life".

Malone is "devoted to equestrian sports, she owns expansive estates and performance centers in Pennsylvania and Florida."

In 2006, Malone purchased an oceanfront home in Barnegat Light, New Jersey.

References

American billionaires
Living people
Year of birth missing (living people)
Place of birth missing (living people)
Campbell Soup Company people
People from Coatesville, Pennsylvania
University of Arizona alumni
Dorrance family